Destiny Anne Norton (November 30, 2000 –  July 16, 2006) was a Salt Lake City, Utah, child who was kidnapped and murdered by a neighbor in 2006.

Murder

Until her death, Norton lived in Salt Lake City, Utah. On July 16, 2006, she disappeared from her home. Her body was found fewer than 100 feet from her home in the basement of her neighbor, 20-year-old Craig Roger Gregerson.

She was last seen as she left her home after arguing with her parents about taking a bath. She lived in a small ranch house with her parents, and  who shared the house for economic reasons.

Volunteers posted missing posters throughout Salt Lake City, describing her several silver capped teeth on the bottom row of her mouth, blonde hair, green eyes, and dressed in a grey shirt with black stripes.

Investigation
After a massive eight-day search by about 5,000 community volunteers, FBI and police, Destiny's body was found on July 24, 2006, less than 100 feet from her home in the basement of her neighbor, 20-year-old Craig Roger Gregerson. Family and friends were initially outraged after the search ended, and accused authorities of mishandling the investigation. An apology on behalf of the family and friends was later issued in a press conference.

Aftermath
Gregerson was formally charged on July 27, 2006 with kidnapping and aggravated murder. He waived his rights to a speedy trial, and later waived his rights to a preliminary hearing which had originally been scheduled for October 3 and 4, 2006. In a plea bargain to avoid the death penalty, he pleaded guilty to capital murder and child kidnapping on December 4, and was sentenced to life in prison without parole for the murder, and fifteen years to life for the kidnapping. The sentences will be served consecutively.

The Destiny Search Project was formed in 2007, was incorporated as a non-profit in 2008, and operated for several years; its website went offline sometime in 2019. In Utah, operations included searches for Camille Cleverley, Hser Ner Moo, Susan Powell and others.

See also 
List of solved missing person cases

References

External links
Warrant: Gregerson Planned Destiny’s Kidnapping
Crime Library - Full Coverage & Story

2006 in Utah
2006 murders in the United States
Deaths by person in Utah
Formerly missing people
History of women in Utah
Incidents of violence against girls
July 2006 crimes
July 2006 events in the United States
Kidnappings in the United States
Missing person cases in Utah
Violence against women in the United States